Dompierre-Becquincourt is a commune in the Somme department in Hauts-de-France in northern France.

Geography

Population

Gallery

See also
Froissy Dompierre Light Railway
Communes of the Somme department

References

Communes of Somme (department)